5TV is a television channel based in St. Petersburg, Russia. Alexey Brodskiy serves as the director general, with Ljubov Sovershaeva serving as the general producer.

History
Channel 5 succeeded the nationwide Leningrad TV channel dating back to 1938, which was immensely popular throughout the Soviet Union during the last years of Perestroika with such programs as 600 Seconds of its editor-in-chief, Alexander Nevzorov. However, later the channel lost much of its popularity. In 1997 its nationwide network was transferred to the newly formed Kultura TV, and the channel continued broadcasting for Saint Petersburg and Leningrad Oblast only.

During the tenure of Governor Vladimir Yakovlev (1996–2003) the channel, then entirely controlled by the city administration and supervised by Yakovlev's vice-governors for mass media and PR, Alexander Potekhin (1997–2001) and Irina Potekhina (2001–2003), became dragged into political scandals around the city's political elites. In October 2006 Petersburg – Channel 5 was licensed to broadcast nationwide again.

Ownership 

The channel is owned by the privately held company  (NMD)  the chairman (of a board of directors) of which since September 2014 is Alina Kabaeva. Olga Paskina is in charge of the director general since 2016.

In 2010 approximately 72% of the NMD shares were held by the public company «TRK Peterburg» (TRK - Teleradiocompany) which also controls the channel.

According to the owners the Channel 5 maintains its own independent news service.

See also
 Television in Russia

References

External links
 

Television channels and stations established in 1938
Russian-language television stations in Russia
Mass media in Saint Petersburg